Hokkaidō 9th district is a constituency of the House of Representatives in the Diet of Japan (national legislature). It consists of Hokkaido's Hidaka and Iburi Subprefectures. As of 2009, 414,438 eligible voters were registered in the district.

Hokkaidō 9th district, like neighboring 8th and 10th district, was considered a "Democratic kingdom" (minshu-ōkoku), a stronghold of the Democratic Party of Japan (DPJ). From its creation in 1996 until 2012 it had been represented by DPJ co-founder Yukio Hatoyama. In 2012, Hatoyama retired. The LDP had nominated Hokkaidō prefectural assemblyman and former Olympic speed skater Manabu Horii as their candidate in July 2012.

In the 2000, 2003 and 2005 general elections, the Liberal Democratic Party's candidate was Hirofumi Iwakura, later mayor of Tomakomai, Iburi Subprefecture. In 2000, Iwakura lost the district to Hatoyama by a margin of less than 3,000 votes.

Before the 1994 electoral reform, the area had been part of Hokkaido 4th district where five representatives were elected by single non-transferable vote. Yukio Hatoyama (New Party Sakigake), Tatsuo Takahashi (LDP) and Tomoko Kami (JCP) had already stood as candidates there in 1993.

List of representatives

Election results

References

Districts of the House of Representatives (Japan)
Politics of Hokkaido